The Royal House of Mathrafal began as a cadet branch of the Welsh Royal House of Dinefwr, taking their name from Mathrafal Castle, their principal seat and effective capital. They effectively replaced the House of Gwertherion, who had been ruling the Kingdom of Powys since late Roman Britain, through the politically advantageous marriage of an ancestor, Merfyn the Oppressor. His son, King Bleddyn ap Cynfyn, would join the resistance of the Anglo-Saxon King Harold Godwinson, against the invasion of William the Conqueror, following the Norman conquest of England. Thereafter, they would struggle with the Plantagenets and the remaining Welsh Royal houses for the control of Wales. Although their fortunes rose and fell over the generations, they are primarily remembered as Kings of Powys and last native Prince of Wales.

History

The House of Mathrafal was effectively established in the wake of the Anglo-Saxon King, Harold Godwinson, and his brother, Tostig Godwinson, Earl of Northumbria, and their disastrous raids of 1062–1063 against the King of Wales, Gruffydd ap Llywelyn. They installed Bleddyn ap Cynfyn as King over Powys and Gwynedd and kept him and his base in Mathrafal close to the Saxon border. Mathrafal Castle became their seat and effective capital in Powys, replacing the Roman city of Viroconium. 

From this point forward, his family jockeyed with the Royal House of Dinefwr and the Royal House of Aberffraw for the control of Wales. (The unrelated dynasty in the Kingdom of Gwent and the Kingdom of Morgannwg was swiftly overrun by the Marcher Lords after the Norman Conquest). The House of Mathrafal's influence was greatest between 1063 and 1081, until they lost control of Gwynedd to a resurgent Aberffraw family following the Battle of Mynydd Carn. By 1191, the Kingdom of Powys was divided between the Principality of Powys Fadog in the north and the Principality of Powys Wenwynwyn (roughly modern Montgomeryshire) in the south. The first became a more-or-less loyal vassal of Gwynedd; the latter, one of its main competitors.

Historian John Davies points out that, following the division of Powys, the dynasty should not be considered as "equal" to that of the Royal House of Aberffraw or the Royal House of Dinefwr. Mathrafal Castle was utterly destroyed by Gwynedd in 1212 and thenceforth it was entirely dependent on English support for its survival. However, the Mathrafal dynasty continued to exert some influence, undermining and eventually betraying the Prince of Wales, Llywelyn ap Gruffudd, on behalf of the Plantagenet King, Edward Longshanks, during his Conquest of Wales in 128283. 

Thereafter, they avoided his campaign of extermination against the Welsh Royal Houses and even exchanged their claims to royalty for an English Lordship at the Parliament of Shrewsbury in 1283. They were displaced by the Lords of Mortimers in the early 14th century, until a momentary reascension of the House during the 15th century, following the Welsh Revolt led by the Prince of Wales, Owain Glyndŵr, against Prince Henry and King Henry IV of England, of the Royal House of Lancaster.

Welsh Revolt

The rebellions were supported by the French Royal House of Valois, and were an attempt not only at gaining the independence of Wales, but also the redivision of England to their relatives, the House of Percy and the Mortimers.  Despite being Crowned as Owain IV of Wales in 1404, and having taking control of all Wales, and having created the first Welsh parliament at Harlech Castle, they eventually lost the war to the English forces of Henry V. 

Nonetheless, their efforts didn't go in vain, as their rebellion gave rise to the first Welsh Kings of England, the Royal House of Tudor. The Tudors were their cousins on their 
mother's side, through the Tudors of Penmynydd, who fought with them during the rebellions, such a Sir Owen Tudor, the second husband of Queen Catherine de Valois. He also captured number of Longshanks’s main castles such as Conwy, Harlech, and Beaumaris, and besieged Caernarfon. This historic period would later be immortalized by William Shakespeare in his play Henry IV, Part 1 and Part 2, featuring "Owen Glendower" as a character.

The House was succeeded by the descendants of Prince Owain Glyndŵr and his brother, Lord Tudur ap Gruffudd, through the Vaughans of Cors-y-Gedol.  They are today represented by its derivative branches; the House of Yale (Yale family) and the Rogers of Bryntangor, who act as co-representatives of the dynasty. They are also the co-representatives of the Sovereign dynasties of North Wales (Gwynedd) and South Wales (Dinefwr), having their genealogies traced back to the Romano-British ruler Cunedda. 

These Houses are also cadet branches of the FitzGerald Dynasty, and direct descendants of the Plantagenets. The Wynn baronets, who are today represented by the Williams-Wynns, are related to the House, through the Princes of Aberffraw and the Wynne family of Peniarth.

Ancestry

Along with the Royal Houses of Aberffraw, Dinefwr, and Seisyll, the House of Mathrafal traced their descent from King Merfyn the Oppressor who, along with his son, King Rhodri the Great, established control over northern and western Wales. Rhodri replaced King Cyngen ap Cadell as ruler of the Kingdom of Powys after the latter died while on a pilgrimage to Rome. His father, Merfyn, had previously allied his family with the last rulers of Powys by marrying Princess Nest, the daughter or sister of King Cyngen. 

Her family was of the Royal House of Gwertherion, and had been ruling Powys since the 5th century, through the marriage of an ancestor, Vortigern, the High-King, to Sevira, the daughter of the Roman Emperor, Magnus Maximus. Their capital was at Viroconium, a Roman city that been founded by Caesar's Legio XIV Gemina, and abandoned later by Legio XX Valeria, for the fortress at Deva Victrix (Chester).

As a consequence of this alliance, King Cyngen's legitimate heirs were either exiled or reduced to the level of minor land owners (e.g., the family of Sir Gruffudd Vychan). Yet, one of the last Kings of Powys, Cadell ap Brochfael, maternal great-grandfather of Bleddyn ap Cynfyn, the first King of the House of Mathrafal, claimed descent from Cyngen's son Aeddan, who seems to have ruled straight after. 

Other noble families claimed descent from another of Cyngen's sons, Elisedd, who is mentioned as killing his older brother Gruffydd in the Annales Cambriae. It is therefore likely that Gwynedd's hegemony over Powys was merely propaganda, intended to glorify Gwynedd at the expense of Powys before the time of Prince Owain Gwynedd. Therefore, there was a lot of political instability as the House had to rule two Kingdoms, Powys and Gwynedd.

In the traditional accounts, Rhodri the Great divided his Kingdom among his sons and gave Powys to his youngest, Prince Merfyn. King Cadell in Ceredigion then dispossessed his brother and added Powys to his inheritance. It is possible, however, that Powys remained independent until its 916 annexation by Cadell's son Hywel Dda, who also conquered Dyfed and Gwynedd and established what has become known as the realm of Deheubarth. On the death of Hywel's grandson in 999, Maredudd ab Owain, the realm splintered: Irishmen usurped Gwynedd and falsely passed themselves off as Maredudd's heir in Dyfed. These were removed by King Llywelyn ap Seisyll, from a cadet branch of the Aberffraw line in the commote of Rhuddlan.

Members

Members of the Mathrafal Dynasty include:

Bleddyn ap Cynfyn, King of Powys and Gwynedd, joined the Saxon resistance with King Harold Godwinson, of the Royal House of Godwin, against William the Conqueror 
Gruffydd ap Llywelyn, King of Wales, Morgannwg, Powys, Deheubarth and Gwynedd, made an agreement with King Edward the Confessor, of the Royal House of Wessex
Rhiwallon ap Cynfyn, King of Powys and Gwynedd, his daughter married the King of Deheubarth, Rhys ap Tewdwr, of the Royal House of Dinefwr
Trahaearn ap Caradog, King of Gwynedd, fought against the King of the Welsh, Gruffudd ap Cynan, of the Royal House of Aberffraw, and the Norman Lord Robert of Rhuddlan
Rhiryd ap Bleddyn, King of Powys, killed at war by the King of South Wales, Rhys ap Tewdwr, of the Royal House of Dinefwr
Cadwgan ap Bleddyn, Prince of Powys, married to a member of the House of De Say, companions of William the Conqueror, was an ally of King Gruffudd ap Cynan against the Montgomeries
Owain ap Cadwgan, Prince of Powys, he and his father lost lands to King Henry I of England, was known for his abduction of Princess Nest, wife of Gerald de Windsor, of the House of FitzGerald
Iorwerth ap Bleddyn, Prince of Powys, joined the rebellions of Robert of Bellême, 3rd Earl of Shrewsbury, of the House of Bellême, then betrayed him with Lord William Pantulf
Maredudd ap Bleddyn, Prince, later King of Powys, made peace with King Henry I of England, of the Royal House of Normandy
Gruffydd Fychan ap Iorwerth, Marcher Lord, Knight of Rhodes and Knight of the Order of Saint John of Jerusalem, fought in the Crusades under the Knights Hospitaller, rivals of the Knights Templar
Gwladys ferch Rhiwallon, Queen of Deheubarth, and mother of Princess Nesta, who had a son with King Henry I of England, son of William the Conqueror

Last Prince of Powys

Madog ap Maredudd, Prince of Powys, fought with Ranulf de Gernon, 4th Earl of Chester, for the Holy Roman Empress Matilda, against the King of England, Stephen of Blois, of the Royal House of Blois
Gruffydd Maelor I, Prince of Powys Fadog, Lord of Yale, married to Princess Angharad, daughter of the Prince of Wales, Owain Gwynedd, of the Royal House of Aberffraw
Owain Fychan, Lord of Mechain Is Coed, captured Carreghofa Castle, lost it to King Henry II of England, of the Royal House of Angevin, then took it back
Owain Brogyntyn, Lord of Edeirnion, Lord of Dinmael, of Castle Brogyntyn, confirmed Baron by King Edward Longshanks, of the Royal House of Plantagenet, under the terms of the Statute of Rhuddlan 
Marared ferch Madog, mother of the Prince of North Wales and Lord of Snowdonia, Llywelyn the Great, and was married to Iorwerth ab Owain Gwynedd, of the Royal House of Aberffraw
Efa ferch Madog, married to the Prince of Maelienydd, Cadwallon ap Madog, the great-grandson of the Prince of Buellt, who founded one of the Five Royal Tribes of Wales
Gwenllian ferch Madog, daughter of Prince Madog ap Maredudd, ancestress of the Tudors, was married to Lord Rhys, Prince of Wales, who fought and captured many castles of Richard the Lion Heart
Gwenwynwyn ab Owain Cyfeiliog, Ruler of Mid Wales, made an agreement with King Richard the Lionheart, of the Royal House of Plantagenet
Gruffydd ap Gwenwynwyn, Welsh King and Prince of Powys Wenwynwyn, married to Hawise, daughter of Marcher Lord John Lestrange, whose father John II joined the Third Crusade against Saladin
Owen de la Pole, Lord of Powys, family lost their Principality to King Edward Longshanks during his Conquest of Wales, his aunt was Lady Isabella, Queen of Cyprus of the House of Ibelin
Hawys Gadarn, mother of Lord Charlton, he was married to a daughter of Roger Mortimer, 1st Earl of March, who was the great-grandson of King John of Brienne, Emperor of Constantinople
Griffith de la Pole, Lord of Powys, was the uncle of Lord Charlton, who was married to a granddaughter of Joan of Lusignan, member of the Royal House of Lusignan
John Charlton, 3rd Baron Charlton, married to a daughter of the Earl of Stafford, his family included the Duke of Buckingham, Lancaster, Gloucester, and Bavaria of the Royal House of Wittelsbach
Gruffudd Fychan I, Prince of Powys Faddog, Lord of Yale, Edeirnion and Glyndyfrdwy, and great-grandfather of Prince Owain Glyndŵr and Lord Tudor Glendower
Gruffudd Fychan II, Prince of Powys Fadog, married to a great-granddaughter of Eleanor Plantagenet, the daughter of King Edward I and Queen Eleanor of Castile of the Royal House of Ivrea
Eleanor ap Thomas, wife of Prince Gruffudd Fychan II, father was Lord of South Wales, her cousins and in-laws included the Royal houses of Habsburg, Gonzaga, Lorraine, Valois, and Savoy
Owain Glyndŵr, Prince of Wales, hereditary Prince of Powys Fadog, married to Princess Margaret Hanmer, daughter of Sir David Hanmer, started the Welsh Revolt
Tudor Glendower, Lord of Gwyddelwern, brother of the Prince of Wales and cousin of the Tudors, fought against Prince Henry, of the Royal House of Lancaster, during the Welsh Revolt
Lowry ap Gruffudd, his sister, was married to Robert Puleston, their son held Denbigh Castle for Jasper Tudor, Duke of Bedford, of the Royal House of Tudor, during the Wars of the Roses
John Charlton, 4th Baron Charlton, family included Duchess Elizabeth FitzAlan, ancestress of Queen Anne Boleyn, and Beatrice, daughter of King John I of Portugal of the Royal House of Aviz 
Edward Charlton, 5th Baron Charlton, married to Alianore Holland, in-law of Lord Visconti, niece of King Richard II, great-grandmother of King Edward IV and Richard III, of the Royal House of York
Maredudd ab Owain Glyndŵr, son of the Prince of Wales, fought in the Welsh Revolt, was later pardoned by King Henry V of England, of the Royal House of Lancaster
Catrin ferch Owain Glyndŵr, married to Sir Edmund Mortimer, great-nephew of Prince John of Gaunt and Edward the Black Prince, and great-grandson of King Edward of Windsor and Queen Philippa of Hainault
Elissau ap Gruffudd (Ellis ap Griffith), Baron of Gwyddelwern, grandson of Lord Tudor Glendower, and grandfather of Chancellor Thomas Yale, the great-great-granduncle of Gov. Elihu Yale

Notes

References

Lewys Dwnn Heraldic Visitations of Wales and Part of the Marches between the years 1586 and 1613

Sources

 
Welsh royal houses